Zhao Jianbo (born 17 May 2001) is a Chinese footballer currently playing as a forward for Dalian Pro.

Club career
Zhao Jianbo was selected by the Wanda Group youth player project, and gained a chance to train with Spanish club Villarreal CF in 2013. On his return to China he would join Wanda Group owned Dalian Yifang's youth team. With them he would win the under-19 championship title in 2018. He would go on to be promoted to the senior team in the 2020 Chinese Super League campaign. He made his professional debut on 25 August 2020 in a league game against Guangzhou Evergrande that ended in a 2-2 draw. He would go on to score his first goal on 14 December 2022 in a league game against Wuhan Three Towns F.C. in a 2-1 defeat.

Career statistics

References

External links
 

2001 births
Living people
Chinese footballers
Chinese expatriate footballers
Association football forwards
Chinese Super League players
Villarreal CF players
Dalian Professional F.C. players
Chinese expatriate sportspeople in Spain
Expatriate footballers in Spain